The Zijiang M99 is a semi-automatic anti-materiel rifle first introduced in 2005. It has since seen use by the People's Liberation Army Navy and Marine Corps in anti-piracy operations in the Gulf of Aden, and has been seen in the hands of various rebel groups involved in the Syrian Civil War.

Overview 
The Type 99 is a lightweight 12.7x108 mm, direct impingement gas-operated, anti-materiel rifle. It features a large muzzle brake to aid in the mitigation of the recoil produced by its cartridge. A 2006 trial conducted by the Pakistan Army indicated that the rifle is capable of 1.6 MOA accuracy with the appropriate precision ammunition. The acquisition of the M99 by rebel forces in Syria is thought to have been brokered through Qatar or Sudan.

Variants 
M99-II: .50 BMG variant.
M06: Bullpup, drum magazine-fed variant.

Users 

 : People's Liberation Army Navy and People's Liberation Army Marine Corps
  Iraqi Kurdistan
 : Myanmar Army-Sniper division and units at light infantry battalions

Non-State Actors
  Free Syrian Army
 
 United Wa State Army

See also 
Accuracy International AS50
Barrett M82/M107

References

12.7×108 mm sniper rifles
Semi-automatic rifles
Sniper rifles of the People's Republic of China
Anti-materiel rifles